Exoletuncus musivus is a species of moth of the family Tortricidae. It is found in Peru.

The wingspan is 26 mm. The ground colour of the forewings is white. The pattern elements are black. The hindwings are paler than the forewings.

References

Moths described in 1997
Euliini
Moths of South America
Taxa named by Józef Razowski